A gold rush is a sharp migration of people to an area believed to have significant gold deposits.

Gold Rush or Goldrush may also refer to:

Gold rushes
 Gold rush#Gold rushes by region:
 Australian gold rushes
 Black Hills Gold Rush
 California Gold Rush
 Cariboo Gold Rush
 Klondike Gold Rush
 Nome Gold Rush
 Otago Gold Rush

Arts, entertainment, and media

Films
 Gold Rush (1998 film), a Hong Kong film with Lung Fong
 Goldrush: A Real Life Alaskan Adventure, a 1998 made-for-TV adventure film
 Kummeli: Kultakuume or Kummeli: Goldrush, a Finnish film
The Gold Rush, 1925 Charlie Chaplin film

Gaming 
 Gold Rush!, a computer adventure game
 Gold Rush, a map on Team Fortress 2
 Impossible Spell Card, a video game, one version of which was called Danmaku Amanojaku - Gold Rush

Music 
 Goldrush (band), a rock band
 Gold Rush (album), a 2011 album by I Can Make a Mess Like Nobody's Business
 "Gold Rush" (song), a 2018 song by Death Cab for Cutie
 "Gold Rush", a song by Ed Sheeran from the 2011 album +
 "Gold Rush", a song by DJ Yoshitaka and Michael a la mode from the 2007 video game Beatmania IIDX: Gold
 "Gold Rush", a song by Clinton Sparks from the 2014 EP ICONoclast
 "Gold Rush", a song by Taylor Swift from the 2020 album Evermore
"Gold Rush", the title song of Ike Moriz's 2017 album
 "Goldrush (song)", a song by Yello from the 1987 album One Second
 "The Goldrush", a song by Coldplay from the 2009 album Life in Technicolor II
 After the Gold Rush, a 1970 song and album by Neil Young

Other uses in arts, entertainment, and media
 Gold Rush (TV series), a documentary television series that airs on Discovery Channel
 Gold Rush: White Water, a spin-off series of Gold Rush
 Gold Rush (web series), a 2006 American reality competition web series
 "Gold Rush!", a 1986 episode of The Raccoons
 Gold Rush, a 1998 novel by Miri Yu
 Gold Rush Country (Dreamworld), a themed area inside the Dreamworld amusement park in Gold Coast, Australia
 Gold Rush (Slagharen), a roller coaster at Attractiepark Slagharen in the Netherlands
 San Francisco 49ers Gold Rush, the cheerleaders of the San Francisco 49ers, an American football team

Places
 Klondike Gold Rush National Historical Park, a United States National Historical Park